Dicoy Williams (born 7 October 1986, in Kingston) is a Jamaican footballer.

Playing career

Youth and Amateur
Williams started his career in the youth ranks of Jamaica's Santos FC. He also went on to play for the youth teams of Arnett Gardens FC and Harbour View FC.

Professional
Williams played at the professional level for Santos FC and Harbour View FC in the top flight Jamaica National Premier League. Williams was a key contributor for Harbour View helping the club capture the league title in 2010. After impressing with Harbour View FC Williams went on trial with Norwegian Division One side Mjøndalen IF during the 2010 season.

In early March 2011 Williams continued to explore overseas options going on trial with Major League Soccer side Toronto FC. He impressed coach Aron Winter and was signed by Toronto FC on 31 March 2011. Two days later Williams made his debut for Toronto as a second half sub for Nana Attakora in a 1–1 home draw against Chivas USA. On 19 July 2011 Aron Winter confirmed that Williams would miss the remainder of the 2011 season. On 20 June 2012 Williams made his return from injury as a second half sub for Danny Koevermans in a 3–3 away draw to Houston Dynamo.

Williams was released by Toronto on 15 November 2012.

Dicoy returned to Harbour View in 2013.

International
Dicoy Williams made his international debut for Jamaica on 12 August 2009 in a scoreless draw against Ecuador played at Giants Stadium. Williams was called up to his first international tournament for the 2011 CONCACAF Gold Cup. He started the first game for Jamaica which ended in a 4–0 victory over Grenada, however in the second game of the group stage against Guatemala Williams hurt his knee forcing Theodore Whitmore to make a 10th minute substitution.

International goals
Scores and results list Jamaica's goal tally first.

Coaching career 

In 2022, Williams joined Arnett Gardens as an assistant coach.

Honours 
Harbour View FC
Jamaica National Premier League: (1):2010

Toronto FC
Canadian Championship (2):''' 2011, 2012

References

External links
 
 
 sportsagencyja.com 

1986 births
Living people
Jamaican footballers
Jamaican expatriate footballers
Jamaica international footballers
Association football defenders
Harbour View F.C. players
Toronto FC players
2011 CONCACAF Gold Cup players
Expatriate soccer players in Canada
Major League Soccer players
Sportspeople from Kingston, Jamaica
National Premier League players
Santos F.C. (Jamaica) players
Arnett Gardens F.C. players